Trimmel is a surname. Notable people with this surname include:

 Christopher Trimmel (born 1987), Austrian football player
 Clemens Trimmel (born 1978), Austrian tennis player
 Nicole Trimmel (born 1982), Austrian kickboxer

Fictional characters
 Paul Trimmel, character in Tatort